The Kala Keerthi is a Sri Lankan national honour awarded "for extraordinary achievements and contributions in arts, culture and drama". It is the highest national honour for arts, culture and drama in Sri Lanka. It is conventionally used as a title or prefix to the awardee's name. Kala Keerthi ranks lower than Vidya Jyothi.

Awardees
Awardees include: 

1986
 Wannakuwattawaduge Don Amaradeva
 Rohan de Saram
 Dayananda Ekanatha Hettiarachchi
 George Keyt
 Lester James Peries

1987
 Ananda Weihena Palliya Guruge
 Prof Nandadasa Kodagoda
 Anton Wickremasinghe

1988
 Prof Thomas Earle Joseph de Fonseka
 Dr Punchi Bandara Sannasgala
 Varindra Tarzie Vittachi

1989
 Eileen Siriwardhana
 Alankarage Victor Suraweera
 Lorna Srimathie Dewaraja
 Jinadasa Vijayatunge

1990
 Miniwandeni Pathirannehelage Tillakaratna
 Arumugam Kandiah

1991
 Wimal Abayasundera
 Diongu Badaturuge Nihalsinghe

1992
 Edwin Ariyadasa
 Ananda Salgado Kulasooriya

1993
 Sembuge Shelton Gamini Fonseka
 Miguel Hewage Goonatilleka
 Chitra Malinee Jayasinghe Peris
 Ponniah Poologasingham
 Jayadeva Tilakasiri
 Vini Vitharana

1994
 Pinnaduwa Hewa Cyril de Silva Kulathilaka
 Chitrasena
 Swarna Jayaweera
 Sinnathamby Thillainathan
 Madawala Sirisena Ratnayake
 Wimal Wickrama Surendra
 Mawanana Hewa Peter Silva
 Anuradha Seneviratne
 Nambukara Thanthrige Karunaratna Gunapala Senadheera
 Ashley Halpe

1998
 Premasiri Kemadasa 
 Irangani Serasinghe
 Regi Siriwardena
 Dharmasiri Jayakody
 Nalini Jayasuriya

2005
 A. J. Canagarathnam
 A. Jesurasa
 A. Sivananthan
 Asoka Handagama
 Bharahmasri Sarveswara Sarma
 Carl Muller
 Dharmasena Pathiraja
 Dharmasiri Bandaranayake
 Enid Anula Aluvihare De Silva
 Gamini Haththotuwegama
 Geetha Kumarasinghe
 Gnarathan
 Henry Jayasena
 Jackson Anthony
 Jayalath Manoratne
 Karthigesu Sivathamby 
 Kulanthai M. shunmugalingam
 Latha Walpola
 M. Kanakasabai
 Malini Fonseka
 Monica Ruwanpathirana (Posthumous)
 Olga De Livera
 T. B. Richard M. Don Gabriel
 Pandithar Sachchithanantham
 Prasanna Vithanage
 Rohana Weerasinghe
 S. Maunaguru
 S. Pani Bharatha (Posthumous)
 Sanath Gunathilake
 Sanath Nandasiri
 Santhini Sevanesan
 Shyam Selvadurai
 Sybil Wettasinghe
 Simon Navagattegama (Posthumous)
 Somalatha Subasinghe
 Sri Jayana Rajapakse
 Sumitra Peries
 Swarna Mallawarachchi
 Tilak Abeysinghe
 Tissa Ranasinghe
 Vimukthi Jayasundara
 Vasantha Obeysekera

2017 
 Arun Dias Bandaranaike
 Edmand Ranasinghe
 G. Kartini Drahaman Mohamed
 George Edmond Jayasinghe
 Gunawardhana Mudalige Ajith Hemachandra
 Hapuwalanege Don Ariyadasa (Dasa Hapuwalana)
 Herman Ronald Lakshman De Alwis
 Ivor Dennis
 Kurukulasuriya Eligius Camillus Perera
 Lalitha Sarathchandra
 Lionel Bentharage
 Madhubhashini Disanayaka Ratnayaka
 Namel Weeramuni
 Nanayakkarage Sumana Jayatillake
 Nellampitiya Pathirana Arachchige Dayawathi (Daya Nellampitiya)
 Ranasinghe Arachchige Jayantha Prema Lal Hegoda
 Saravanai Vinayagamoorthy
 Singarampillai Thillanadarajah
 Suminda Sirisena
 Suresh Maliyadde
 Sunanda Mahendra
 Wijesinghe Arachchilage Abeysingha

References

External links

 
Civil awards and decorations of Sri Lanka